Zhang Yan may refer to:

 Empress Zhang Yan (張嫣; died 163 BC), Western Han empress
 Zhang Yan (Han dynasty) (張燕), late Eastern Han bandit chief
 Zhang Quanyi or Zhang Yan (張言; 852–926), Tang dynasty / Five Dynasties warlord
 Zhang Yan (Ming dynasty) (張彥), Ming dynasty painter
 Xi Xi or Zhang Yan (張彥; born 1938), Hong Kong writer
 Zhang Yan (oil painter) (张焰; born 1963), Chinese oil painter
 Zhang Yan (biathlete) (born 1992), Chinese biathlete
 Zhang Yan (figure skater) (born 1988), Chinese pair skater
 Zhang Yan (footballer, born 1972), Chinese football player
 Zhang Yan (table tennis) (born 1967), table tennis player
 Zhang Yan (footballer, born 1997), Chinese footballer
 Zhang Yan (born 1917), major general of the People's Liberation Army.